Tmesisternus viridescens is a species of beetle in the family Cerambycidae. It was described by James Thomson in 1864.

References

viridescens
Beetles described in 1864